Plaza San Martín is a common name for squares in many towns and cities of Argentina and Perú. The name honors the national hero General José de San Martín.

Argentina 

 Plaza San Martín (Buenos Aires)
 Plaza San Martín (Rosario)
 Plaza San Martín (Córdoba)

Peru 

 Plaza San Martín (Lima)